That's How We Roll is the fifth studio album by Gordon Goodwin's Big Phat Band, released on April 12, 2011. It features the title track, "That's How We Roll", the Grammy-nominated "Hunting Wabbits 3 (Get Off My Lawn)", and the Grammy-winning "Rhapsody in Blue".

Track listing

References

2011 albums
Gordon Goodwin's Big Phat Band albums
Telarc Records albums